Grimsby is a UK seaport on the Humber Estuary in North East Lincolnshire.

Grimsby may also refer to:

Places
 Grimsby, Illinois, an unincorporated community in the United States
 Grimsby, Ontario, a town in Ontario, Canada
 Little Grimsby, village near Louth, Lincolnshire, England, part of Brackenborough with Little Grimsby parish 
 Great Grimsby (UK Parliament constituency), a United Kingdom parliamentary constituency
 New Grimsby and Old Grimsby, villages on the island of Tresco

Sport
 Grimsby Town F.C., a Football League club
 Grimsby Borough F.C., a Central Midlands Football League club

Military
 Grimsby Chums, a British First World War Pals battalion
 RAF Grimsby, a World War II RAF station
 Grimsby class sloop, a World War II class of warships
 HMS Grimsby (U16)

Other uses
 "Grimsby" (song), a song by Elton John from his 1974 album Caribou
 Grimsby (film), a 2016 action-comedy film starring Sacha Baron Cohen
 Roger Grimsby (1928–1995), a former American news anchor and actor
 Grimsby, a character from the 1970 Rankin/Bass Christmas special Santa Claus Is Coming to Town
 Grimsby, a character from Disney's 1989 animated film The Little Mermaid

See also
 Grimsay (disambiguation)